School of Jazz may refer to:

Lenox School of Jazz, summer programme of jazz education from 1957 to 1960, at the Music Barn in Lenox, Massachusetts, USA 
Rimon School of Jazz and Contemporary Music, Israel
School of Jazz (The New School), part of the College of Performing Arts at The New School, New York, NY, USA